The greater akialoa group was a set of three species of birds growing up to  long. Its bill took up to a third of the body length.  The group had three species, confined to the Hawaiian Islands of  Lanai, Oahu and Kauai respectively.  It did not include the much smaller Lesser ʻakialoa, which was considered a full species.  The Lanai and Oahu forms are extinct, while there is a remote possibility that the Kauai form survives.

 Kauaʻi ʻakialoa (Hemignathus stejnegeri) (Wilson, 1889)
 Maui Nui ʻakialoa (Hemignathus lanaiensis)
 Oahu ʻakialoa (Hemignathus ellisiana)

References

Greater akialoa
Extinct birds of Hawaii
Endemic fauna of Hawaii
Bird extinctions since 1500